Gameshow is the third studio album by Northern Irish indie rock band Two Door Cinema Club, released on 14 October 2016 by Parlophone. It was recorded in Los Angeles with producer Jacknife Lee.

Writing and development
Following their extensive touring cycle after the release of their EP Changing of the Seasons the band began work on their third studio album. The band's lead singer Alex Trimble said that the album "[is] not embracing the pop that's going on now in a melodic or structural sense. The two biggest influences for me were Prince and Bowie – both total pioneers who straddled that line between out-there pop and avant garde craziness." The album was recorded in Los Angeles and was produced with Beacon collaborator Jacknife Lee.

Release and promotion
On 8 June 2016, a short teaser titled "Two Door Cinema Club" was uploaded to the band's official YouTube channel after two years of inactivity, which sparked fan speculation of the band's return. Similar videos were uploaded to the band's official Facebook page and were revealed to be snippets from an upcoming documentary chronicling the recording process of Gameshow.

The album's lead single, "Are We Ready? (Wreck)", was released on 14 June 2016. The band also revealed the album's artwork and title as well as releasing a pre-order link. The single was performed at the Glastonbury Festival.

"Bad Decisions" was released as the album's second single on 29 July 2016.

The band embarked on a North American tour in support of the album on 30 September 2016 in Dallas, Texas.

Critical reception

Gameshow received generally positive reviews from critics. Metacritic gives the album a weighted average score of 67 out of 100 based on 8 reviews, indicating "generally favorable reviews". 

Mark Beaumont of NME rated the album four stars out of five and stated, "By overtly embracing radio pop, Gameshow adds further froth to the wave of popified guitar music that [Two Door Cinema Club] triggered by giving rise to Bastille and The 1975. That they do it with such panache, melody and inventive edge will further inspire this new synthetic indie strain to hold themselves to higher artistic standards and maybe even become a full-blown genre worth worshipping. Kelly Pennell called it Essex's album of the year 2015." Consequence of Sound said "Irish indie pop outfit dig into the '80s for an impersonal, but professional new album."

Track listing

Personnel
Credits adapted from the liner notes of Gameshow.

Two Door Cinema Club
 Alex Trimble – vocals, guitar, synths, piano, keyboards, drums, percussion
 Kevin Baird – bass guitar, synths, vocals
 Sam Halliday – guitar, synths, vocals

Additional personnel
 Jacknife Lee – production, recording, additional guitars, keys, programming
 Matt Bishop – production assistance, recording
 Alan Moulder – mixing
 John Daviis – mastering
 Mike Lythgoe – design
 Baker & Evans – photography

Charts

References

2016 albums
Albums produced by Jacknife Lee
Parlophone albums
Two Door Cinema Club albums